Virgil Township is one of sixteen townships in Kane County, Illinois, USA.  As of the 2010 census, its population was 1,937 and it contained 766 housing units. The land is primarily used for agriculture.

Geography

Cities, towns, villages
 Maple Park (all but western edge)
 Virgil

Extinct settlements
 Meredith at 
 Richardson at

Cemeteries
The township contains these two cemeteries: Saints Peter and Paul's Catholic Cemetery and Thatcher Cemetery.

Airports and landing strips
 Aeroview Airport
 Miller/Maple Park Farm Airport

Demographics

School districts
 Central Community Unit School District 301
 Kaneland Community Unit School District 302
 Sycamore Community Unit School District 427

Political districts
 Illinois's 14th congressional district
 State House District 50
 State Senate District 25

References
 
 United States Census Bureau 2009 TIGER/Line Shapefiles
 United States National Atlas

External links
 
 History
 City-Data.com
 Illinois State Archives
 Township Officials of Illinois

Townships in Kane County, Illinois
Townships in Illinois
1849 establishments in Illinois